Colchagua Club de Deportes or just Colchagua is a chilean Football club, their home town is San Fernando in Chile. They currently play in the Tercera Division A (Third Division A) of Chilean football, which is actually the fourth division on chilean football due to ANFP ruling. Its traditional rivals are Rancagua Sur and O'Higgins both from the city of Rancagua in the O'Higgins Region which is where San Fernando is also located, it also has rivalry with General Velásquez from the nearby town of San Vicente and with Deportes Santa Cruz. They also share some kind of brotherhood and «healthy» rivalry at the same time with Curicó Unido from the city of Curicó in the Maule Region, this is due to the fact that San Fernando and Curicó are both pretty close to the regional border between O'Higgins and Maule, both cities are approximately 45 minutes away from each other, so when the La Granja stadium started it's reconstruction during early 2010, Colchagua let Curicó Unido play as local at the Jorge Silva Valenzuela stadium in San Fernando, these two teams dispute the Clásico Huaso because both teams are located in the denominated Zona Huasa (Huasa Zone) of the country.

Squad
.

Titles

Tercera División (2): 1987, 1998

See also
Chilean football league system

External links
Colchagua official Blog 

Colchagua
Colchagua
1957 establishments in Chile